Sparta Township is one of thirteen townships in Noble County, Indiana. As of the 2010 census, its population was 2,924 and it contained 1,104 housing units.

History
Stone's Trace was listed on the National Register of Historic Places in 1984.

Geography

Cities and towns
 Cromwell

Unincorporated towns
 Indian Village at 
 Kimmell at 
(This list is based on USGS data and may include former settlements.)

References

External links
 Indiana Township Association
 United Township Association of Indiana

Townships in Noble County, Indiana
Townships in Indiana